The 1986 Stock Car Brasil Championship was the eighth season of Stock Car Brasil that consecrated as champion of this season, Marcos Gracia.

Drivers
All cars were Chevrolet Opala.

References

External links
  

Stock Car Brasil seasons
Stock Car Brasil season